Mafia is a 1993 Indian Malayalam- language action crime film directed by Shaji Kailas and written by Renji Panicker. It stars Suresh Gopi, Vikram, Janardhanan, Tiger Prabhakar, Babu Antony, Vijayaraghavan and Geetha. 

Mafia was released on 12 November 1993 and became successful at the box office.

Plot
DSP Jayashankar, a sincere senior cop, along with Bangalore City Police Department (B.C.P.D) is in a direct fight with a crime boss named Surya Devaraja Gowda, who rules the city along with his younger brother Chandra. Jayashankar's family is too worried about his safety and younger brother Harishankar always reminds him of it. Shivaraman "Shivappa", a former mafia leader is now leading a retired life in the city suburbs running a stable. Though retired, he has deep vengeance against Gowda, who had broken his leg, making him permanently disabled. Jayashankar longs his brother Ravishankar to join the IPS. Currently working for a leading Bangalore daily Deccan Chronicle, Ravi is also attempting for IPS. 

One day, Jayashankar receives a piece of information that a consignment belonging to Gowda is arriving in the city. Along with Inspector Narayanan, Jayashankar manages to seize the trucks, but gets shot and killed by Gowda's goons. Ravi, who has just got a letter confirming his selection for IPS, reaches Jayashankar to inform the news, witnesses the brutal murder of Jayashankar. Ravi reaches out to the commissioner's office, but is shocked to find the killers, having a small talk with DCP Govindan. Ravi reacts violently and raises his hands at Govindan, accusing him of siding with Gowda. Govindan orders the arrest of Ravi, where the court sentences him to 2 years imprisonment for assaulting a senior cop on duty. Ravi loses his IPS selection because of his prison term. 

Upon release, Ravi decides to avenge Jayashankar's death. Hari introduces Ravi to Alexandra "Sandra" Amelia Felix, the daughter of an ex-mafiosi, who was killed by Gowda. Sandra is now running a few business offices of which Hari is the manager. Sandra agrees to help Ravi in his mission, where she introduces him to Shivappa. Though initially reluctant, Ravi agrees to provide money and weapons in the war against Gowda. The central government nominates and promotes Govindan as the city commissioner. At a function organized to felicitate Govindan, Ravi intrudes along with Hari and insults him publicly. 

The sudden and violent reaction of Govindan is recorded and passed over to higher authorities, causing Govindan's suspension. Ravi targets the establishments of Gowda, where he  along with Shivappa blackmails Home Minister Nanjappa and gets Gowda's warehouses raided. The financial losses enrages Gowda and  sends Chandra to finish out Ravi, but Chandra is killed by Ravi. Gowda kidnaps Hari and offers a deal. Upon the demand of Gowda, Ravi arrives, but along with Shivappa and his mercenaries. Ravi successfully saves Hari and finishes off Gowda by overrunning cars over him.

Cast

Box office
The film was commercial success and grossed ₹7 crore at the box office. While Suresh Gopi got 2.25 lakhs for his role, its Telugu rights were sold for 25 lakhs.

References

External links
 

1990s Malayalam-language films
1993 films
1990s crime action films
Indian crime action films
Indian films about revenge
Fictional portrayals of the Karnataka Police
Indian gangster films
Films shot in Bangalore
Films directed by Shaji Kailas